The FIRE (Financial Independence, Retire Early) movement is a lifestyle movement with the goal of gaining financial independence and retiring early. The model became particularly popular among millennials in the 2010s, gaining traction through online communities via information shared in blogs, podcasts, and online discussion forums.

Those seeking to attain FIRE intentionally maximize their savings rate by finding ways to increase income and/or decrease expenses, along with aggressive investments that again increases their wealth and/or income. The objective is to accumulate assets until the resulting passive income provides enough money for living expenses throughout one's retirement years. Many proponents of the FIRE movement suggest the 4% rule as a rough withdrawal guideline, thus setting a goal of at least 25 times one's estimated annual living expenses. Upon reaching financial independence, paid work becomes optional, allowing for retirement from traditional work decades earlier than the standard retirement age.

Background 
FIRE is achieved through aggressive saving, far more than the standard 10–15% typically recommended by financial planners. Assuming expenses are equal to income minus savings, and neglecting investment returns, observe that:

 At a savings rate of 10%, it takes (1-0.1)/0.1 = 9 years of work to save for 1 year of living expenses.
 At a savings rate of 25%, it takes (1-0.25)/0.25 = 3 years of work to save for 1 year of living expenses.
 At a savings rate of 50%, it takes (1-0.5)/0.5 = 1 year of work to save for 1 year of living expenses.
 At a savings rate of 75%, it takes (1-0.75)/0.75 = 1/3 year = 4 months of work to save for 1 year of living expenses.

From this example, it can be concluded that the time to retirement decreases significantly as savings rate is increased. For this reason, those pursuing FIRE attempt to save 50% or more of their income. At a 75% savings rate, it would take less than 10 years of work to accumulate 25 times the average annual living expenses suggested by 'the 4% safe withdrawal' rule.

There are also two sides to the spectrum of FIRE. Lean FIRE refers to the ability to retire early on a smaller accumulation of retirement income and limited living expenses which will require a frugal lifestyle during retirement. On the other end of this is Fat FIRE, which refers to the ability to retire early due to a large amount of accumulated wealth and passive income with no concerns about living expenses during retirement. A hybrid of these two is known as Barista FIRE, which refers to a semi-retired lifestyle of working part-time for some supplemental income, or retiring fully but with a partner who continues to work.

FIRE is viewed as a lifestyle, not simply an investment strategy. A common thread that challenges individuals that subscribe to the FIRE lifestyle is finding partners that share the same fiscal goals. Availability of online resources helps the movement to expand among Millennial high-net-worth individuals.

The emergence of social media has brought more attention to worker's sharing about their dissatisfaction. "Social media has made lives appear more glorious and expensive, but also allows others to broadly share about their financial freedom." said Zachary A. Bachner, CFP(r) of Summit Financial.

History 
The main ideas behind the FIRE movement originate from the 1992 best-selling book Your Money or Your Life written by Vicki Robin and Joe Dominguez, as well as the 2010 book Early Retirement Extreme by Jacob Lund Fisker. These works provide the basic template of combining a lifestyle of simple living with income from investments to achieve financial independence. In particular, the latter book describes the relationship between savings rate and time to retirement, which allows individuals to quickly project their retirement date given an assumed level of income and expenses.

The Mr. Money Mustache blog, which started in 2011, is an influential voice that generated interest in the idea of achieving early retirement through frugality and helped popularize the FIRE movement. Other books, blogs, and podcasts continue to refine and promote the FIRE concept.  A Notable contributor to this movement includes Financial Freedom author Grant Sabatier, who works closely with Vicki Robin and popularized the idea of side hustling as a path to accelerate financial independence. In 2018, the FIRE movement received significant coverage by traditional mainstream media outlets. According to a survey conducted by the Harris Poll later that year, 11% of wealthier Americans aged 45 and older have heard of the FIRE movement by name while another 26% are aware of the concept.

2020 saw the introduction of dating sites and blogs dedicated to bringing partners that share the FIRE lifestyle together.

Criticism
Some critics allege that the FIRE movement "is only for the rich", pointing to the difficulties of achieving the high savings rates needed for FIRE on a low income. Another common criticism is that the FIRE movement is composed only of white "tech bros", a notion that highlights the fact that men are overrepresented in media coverage of the FIRE movement. A New York Times story focused on the women and women of color in the FIRE movement.  It highlighted Kiersten Saunders and called Tanja Hester, author of the book Work Optional, "the matriarch of the FIRE women." Paula Pant, host of the Afford Anything podcast, and Jamila Souffrant, host of the Journey to Launch podcast, are also prominent women of color in the FIRE movement. Some also argue that early retirees are not saving enough for early retirement and the many unknowns that come with a longer time period. Because the retirement phase of FIRE could potentially last 70 years, critics say that it is inappropriate to apply the 4% rule, which was developed for a traditional retirement timeframe of 30 years. For that reason, Hester and economist Karsten Jeske argue for a safer withdrawal rate of 3.5% or less, which means saving 30-40 times one's annual spending instead of 25 times if the goal is to retire completely and never earn money again through employment (i.e. providing a service or product).

See also
 Asset/liability modeling
 Do-it-yourself investing
 Downshifting (lifestyle)
 Pension
 Retirement spend down
 Simple living

References 

2010s fads and trends
Lifestyles
Investment
Retirement
Minimalism
Personal finance